Barzizza is a surname of Italian origin. Notable people with the surname include:

Isa Barzizza (born 1929), Italian stage, film and television actress
Gasparino da Barzizza or Gasparinus de Bergamo (c. 1360–c. 1431), Italian grammarian and teacher
Pippo Barzizza (1902–1994), Italian composer, arranger, conductor and music director

Other
Palazzo Barzizza, Gothic-style palace located on the Canal Grande of Venice

Italian-language surnames